Zombie Kiss is a live EP by the band White Zombie.

Music
This EP was recorded live at New York's CBGB in early 1990 supporting their God of Thunder EP. This album features two tracks, God of Thunder and Thrust!, the latter of which would be on their next album La Sexorcisto: Devil Music, Vol. 1.

Track listing

Song information

God of Thunder
A cover of the Kiss song originally from their 1976 album Destroyer.

Thrust!
Thrust would appear on their major label debut La Sexorcisto: Devil Music, Vol. 1 album.

Personnel

Band members
Ivan de Prume – drums
Sean Yseult – bass, art direction
Jay Yuenger – guitar
Rob Zombie – Vocals, Lyricist, art direction

References

White Zombie (band) albums
1989 EPs
Live EPs
1989 live albums
Caroline Records live albums
Caroline Records EPs